Deltoplastis lamellospina is a moth in the family Lecithoceridae. It was described by Chun-Sheng Wu and Kyu-Tek Park in 1998. It is found in Sri Lanka.

The wingspan is 13–14 mm. The forewings are ochreous with a blackish-brown pattern, edged with yellowish white. There is a semi-oval blotch at the basal one-third, not margined at the inner margin. An arched stripe is found from the basal costa to the apical two-thirds of the inner margin. The outer fascia is yellowish white. The area between the outer fascia and the arched stripe is yellowish brown. The termen is blackish brown along the margin. The hindwings are light yellowish brown.

Etymology
The species name is derived from Greek lamella (meaning plate) and spina (meaning spine).

References

Moths described in 1998
Deltoplastis